BRD Tower is the largest and highest office building in Cluj-Napoca, Romania. It was opened in 1997 and stands at 50 meters in height with 12 stories.

See also
BRD Tower Bucharest

External links
Official site

Skyscraper office buildings in Romania
Buildings and structures in Cluj-Napoca
Société Générale

Office buildings completed in 1997